Joyride may refer to:

Film and television

Film
 Joy Ride (1935 film), a British comedy film directed by Harry Hughes
 Joy Ride (1958 film), an American crime film directed by Edward Bernds 
 Joyride (1977 film), an American adventure film directed by Joseph Ruben
 Joyride (1997 film), an American film directed by Quinton Peeples
 Joy Ride (2000 film), a Swiss film by Martin Rengel, certified as Dogme movie #14
 Joy Ride (2001 film), an American horror thriller film directed by John Dahl
 Joyride (2005 film), a Dutch film directed by Frank Herrebout
 Joy Ride, a 2021 American documentary by Bobcat Goldthwait
 Joyride (2022 film), an Irish coming-of-age film directed by Emer Reynolds
 Joy Ride (2023 film), an American comedy film directed by Adele Lim

Television
 Joyride (TV series), a 2004–2005 Philippine drama series
 "Joyride" (Batman Beyond), a 1999 episode
 "Joyride" (The Outer Limits), a 1999 episode
 "Joy Ride" (Steven Universe), a 2015 episode
 "Joy Ride" (The Twilight Zone), a 1987 episode
 "The Joy Ride", a 1975 episode of Upstairs, Downstairs

Literature
 Joyride, a 1994 novel by Jack Ketchum
 Joyride, a 2016 novel by Guy Adams based on the TV series Class
 "Joy Ride", a short story by Richard Russo from his 2002 collection The Whore's Child and Other Stories

Music

Performers
 Joyryde, John Ford (born 1985), English DJ and producer
 Joyride, a member of Australian electronic music duo the Meeting Tree

Albums
 Joy Ride (album), by the Dramatics, 1976
 Joyride (Boom Boom Satellites album) or the title song, 1997
 Joyride (Bryan Duncan album), 2001
 Joyride (Lida Husik album) or the title song, 1995
 Joyride (Oleander album) or the title song, 2003
 Joyride (Pieces of a Dream album) or the title song, 1986
 Joyride (Roxette album) or the title song (see below), 1991
 Joyride (Stanley Turrentine album), 1965
 Joyride (Tinashe album) or the title song, 2018
 Joyride (Transit album), 2014
 Joyride: Remixes, by Mirah, 2006

Songs
 "Joyride" (Roxette song), 1991
 "Joyride (Omen)", by Chevelle, 2016
 "Joyride", by Home Made Kazoku, 2005
 "Joyride", by Jump5 from All the Time in the World, 2002
 "Joy Ride", by the Killers from Day & Age, 2008
 "Joy Ride", by Mariah Carey from The Emancipation of Mimi, 2005
 "Joy Ride", by TLC from TLC, 2017

Other uses
 Joyride (crime), a crime involving stealing vehicles
 Kinect Joy Ride, a 2010 racing game for the Xbox 360
 Red Bull Joyride, a slopestyle mountain biking competition

See also
 Joyrider (disambiguation)
 Rough ride (police brutality)